Charles Lewis Gazin (1904—1995) was an American vertebrate paleontologist and paleobiologist.

Biography
Gazin was born in Colorado in 1904. He got an education at California Institute of Technology and earned  bachelor's degree there in 1927. He got his master's degree in 1928 and a PhD in 1930, and during the same year he began working for the United States Geological Survey. He was named Assistant Curator in the Division of Vertebrate Paleontology at the Smithsonian Institution in 1932. Ten years later, in 1942 he became Associate Curator and in 1946, a Curator of the Division. He was named Senior Paleobiologist in 1967, and when his retirement came in 1970, he got a Paleobiologist Emeritus position. Twelve years later in 1982 he became a Curator Emeritus. He wrote ninety-nine works on vertebrate paleontology, most of which were focused on mammalian paleontology. Gazin served as President of the Society of Vertebrate Paleontology and was a Director of the American Geological Institute.

Among his accomplishments, the Giant Ground Sloth of North America was discovered by Gazin, and has a specimen on display in the Smithsonian Natural History Museum.

References

External links

1904 births
1995 deaths
Smithsonian Institution people
American paleontologists
California Institute of Technology alumni